Sandwith is a settlement and former civil parish about 7 miles from Workington and near St Bees, now in the parish of Whitehaven, in the Copeland district, in the county of Cumbria, England. Sandwith was also a ward, in 2011 the ward had a population of 2463. In 1931 the parish had a population of 332.

History 
The name "Sandwith" means 'Sandy ford'. Sandwith was formerly a township in the parish of St Bees, from 1866 Sandwith was a civil parish in its own right until 1 April 1934 when it was abolished and merged with Rottington and Whitehaven parishes.

References

External links 
 Cumbria County History Trust: Sandwith (nb: provisional research only – see Talk page)

Villages in Cumbria
Former civil parishes in Cumbria
Whitehaven